Darrell Silvera (December 18, 1900 – July 22, 1983) was an American set decorator. He was nominated for seven Academy Awards in the category Best Art Direction. He worked on 356 films between 1934 and 1978.

Selected filmography
Silvera was nominated for seven Academy Awards for Best Art Direction:

 Citizen Kane (1941)
 The Devil and Daniel Webster (1941)
 The Magnificent Ambersons (1942)
 Flight for Freedom (1943)
 Step Lively (1944)
 Experiment Perilous (1944)
 The Man with the Golden Arm (1955)
 The Molly Maguires (1970)

References

External links

1900 births
1983 deaths
American set decorators